Berberis actinacantha is a species of plant also known as michay. It is native to Chile.

References

actinacantha
Flora of Chile